Peter Bell (8 October 1898–1965) was an English footballer who played in the Football League for Darlington, Manchester City and Oldham Athletic.

References

1898 births
1965 deaths
English footballers
Association football forwards
English Football League players
Willington Athletic F.C. players
Durham City A.F.C. players
Oldham Athletic A.F.C. players
Raith Rovers F.C. players
Manchester City F.C. players
Falkirk F.C. players
Burton Town F.C. players